Pseudohongiella spirulinae is a Gram-negative, aerobic and motile bacterium from the genus of Pseudohongiella which has been isolated from a pond which was cultivated with Spirulina platensis from Sanya in China.

References

Alteromonadales
Bacteria described in 2015